The Dilemma is a 1914 short written and directed by George Morgan and featuring William Russell.

External links

1914 films
American silent short films
American black-and-white films
Biograph Company films
1910s American films